The Isa Kaita College of Education is a state government higher education institution located in Dutsin-Ma, Katsina State, Nigeria. 
It is affiliated to Ahmadu Bello University for its degree programmes. The current provost is Maigari Abdu.

History 
The Isa Kaita College of Education was established in 1991.

Courses 
The institution offers the following courses:

 Adult and Non-Formal Education
 Technical Education
 Education and English
 Early Childhood Care Education
 Integrated Science Education
 Economics
 Geography
 Biology Education
 Agricultural Science
 Hausa
 Arabic
 Home Economics
 Chemistry Education
 Computer Education
 Special Education
 Primary Education Studies
 Special Education
 Mathematics
 Social Studies
 Physical And Health Education

Affiliation 
The institution is affiliated with the Ahmadu Bello University to offer programmes leading to Bachelor of Education, (B.Ed.) in:

 Education and Biology
 Education and English Language
 Education and Geography
 Education and History
 Education and Hausa
 Education and Arabic
 Physical Education
 Education and Agricultural Science
 Health Education

References 

Universities and colleges in Nigeria
1991 establishments in Nigeria